Pui To is one of the MTR Light Rail stops. It is elevated at Pui To Road and Castle Peak Road in Tuen Mun District. It began service on 2 February 1992 and belongs to Zone 2.

The stop has reserved area for the construction of the branch line to Chi Lok Fa Yuen, but the plan was left out due to insufficient population in Chi Lok Fa Yuen area.

References

MTR Light Rail stops
Former Kowloon–Canton Railway stations
Tuen Mun District
Railway stations in Hong Kong opened in 1992
1992 establishments in Hong Kong